The women's 4 × 400 metres relay at the 2021 World Athletics U20 Championships was held at the Kasarani Stadium on 22 August.

Records

Results
The final was held on 22 August at 17:55.

References

Relay 4 x 400 metres
Relays at the World Athletics U20 Championships
U20